Zor Barin is a Syrian village located in Awj Nahiyah in Masyaf District, Hama.  According to the Syria Central Bureau of Statistics (CBS), Zor Baarin had a population of 164 in the 2004 census.

References 

Populated places in Masyaf District